Domenico Comino (born 27 September 1955) is an Italian politician, who served as the minister of European affairs and state minister in the mid-1990s.

Biography
Comino was born in Morozzo on 27 September 1955. He is one of the former leaders of Lega Nord. He served as state minister for the EU relations in the first cabinet of Silvio Berlusconi in 1994. Comino was one of the five Lega members in the cabinet who resigned from office in December 1994 in order to vote against Berlusconi in the censure motion.

Comino served in the Italian parliament for three successive periods between 1992 and 1997. Until 1999 he was the Lega Nord's president of the Piedmont region. In 1999, he was expelled from Lega Nord and joined an electoral alliance with Forza Italia.

References

External links

1955 births
Deputies of Legislature XI of Italy
Deputies of Legislature XII of Italy
Deputies of Legislature XIII of Italy
Government ministers of Italy
Lega Nord politicians
Living people
People from the Province of Cuneo
Politicians of Piedmont
University of Turin alumni